The 2021–22 season was the 111th season in the existence of GNK Dinamo Zagreb and the club's 31st consecutive season in the top flight of Croatian football. In addition to the domestic league, Dinamo Zagreb participated in this season's editions of the Croatian Cup, the UEFA Champions League and the UEFA Europa League.

Players

First-team squad

 after match against  HNK Hajduk Split

Transfers

In

Loan returnees

Out

Loan out

Pre-season and friendlies

Competitions

Overall record

Prva HNL

League table

Results summary

Results by round

Matches
The league fixtures were announced on 8 June 2021.

Croatian Cup

UEFA Champions League

First qualifying round
The draw for the first qualifying round was held on 15 June 2021.

Second qualifying round
The draw for the second qualifying round was held on 16 June 2021.

Third qualifying round
The draw for the third qualifying round was held on 19 July 2021.

Play-off round
The draw for the play-off round was held on 2 August 2021.

UEFA Europa League

Group stage

The draw for the group stage was held on 27 August 2021.

Knockout phase

Knockout round play-offs
The Knockout round play-offs draw was held on 13 December 2021.

Statistics

Goalscorers
 after match against  Hrvatski Dragovoljac

References

GNK Dinamo Zagreb seasons
Dinamo Zagreb
2021–22 UEFA Champions League participants seasons
2021–22 UEFA Europa League participants seasons
Croatian football championship-winning seasons